The Other Side of the Tracks (also known as The Haunting of Amelia) is a 2008 independent fantasy film that was written and directed by A. D. Calvo, and is his feature film directorial debut. The movie had its world premiere on March 28, 2008 at the Kent Film Festival and premiered on Showtime on December 2, 2010. It was released onto DVD later that same month under the title The Haunting of Amelia.

Plot
Ten years after a tragic train accident killed his girlfriend, Josh finds himself haunted by disturbing visions from somewhere between the world of the living and the dead—haunting memories that keep him from moving on. His buddy, back in town for their high school reunion, tries to wake Josh from his painful past, but a mysterious young waitress offers a seductive alternative.

Cast
 Brendan Fehr as Josh Stevens
 Chad Lindberg as Rusty Miller
 Tania Raymonde as Emily "Amelia" Meyers
 Beatrice Rosen as Marcy
 Natassia Malthe as Lucinda
 Stephnie Weir as Ann
 Sam Robards as David
 Shirley Knight as Helen

Reception
Critical reception for the film under both titles has been predominantly negative. Film Threat reviewed an early cut of The Other Side of the Tracks, which they criticized for being too predictable. DVD Verdict panned the movie, which they found "pretty forgettable". HorrorNews.net (who reviewed the film under the title of The Haunting of Amelia) commented that the movie was more coming of age than scary and that the film would be appeal most to fans of light horror.

Awards
 Best Feature Film - SENE Film Festival 2009
 Audience Choice Feature - Kent Film Festival 2008
 Best Cinematography - Connecticut Film Festival 2008
 Best Soundtrack - Connecticut Film Festival 2008

Soundtrack
The Other Side of the Tracks features a variety of indie music including bands/artists like: This World Fair, The Alternate Routes, Brightwood, Camera Can't Lie, Volker Hinkel, and John Ralston.

The film features a previously unreleased version of Plastic Soul by This World Fair—best known for their hit "Don't Make Me Wait" from the Disturbia soundtrack. The film also features "Gone, Gone, Gone", a song by John Ralston—a BMI “top pick” and opening act for Dashboard Confessional.

See also
List of ghost films

References

External links
 
 
 

2008 films
2008 fantasy films
2008 independent films
2000s mystery films
2008 psychological thriller films
2008 romantic drama films
American mystery films
American romantic fantasy films
Films set in Connecticut
Films shot in Connecticut
American ghost films
American haunted house films
American independent films
American supernatural horror films
American supernatural thriller films
Rail transport films
American romantic drama films
Films directed by A. D. Calvo
2000s English-language films
2000s American films